Josh Clayton-Felt (May 18, 1967 – January 19, 2000) was an American singer-songwriter and multi-instrumentalist. He co-founded the alternative rock band School of Fish and later embarked on a solo career.

Biography

Early years
Clayton-Felt was one of two children along with his sister Laura born to Jewish parents Marilyn (1938-2006), a playwright and John J. Clayton, a writer. His parents later divorced and his mother would eventually remarry Henry Felt, a folk musician who exposed Clayton-Felt to the works of Lead Belly, Woody Guthrie, and Pete Seeger. At the age of 17, Clayton-Felt visited Israel, writing about his experiences.  He grew up outside of Boston, Massachusetts, and attended high school at the Cambridge School of Weston. He later enrolled at Brown University.

School of Fish
Clayton-Felt moved to Los Angeles after leaving Brown to form The Boon with fellow CSW-alumnus Andras Jones. During this time he worked for acclaimed comedy director Robert B. Weide in 1987 as an informal office assistant during the production of Swear to Tell the Truth. He also worked at the Tower Records store on Sunset Boulevard in West Hollywood.

Josh Clayton-Felt and Michael Ward founded the band School of Fish that went on to musical success in America in the late 1980s through the mid-1990s.

Solo career
After the breakup of School of Fish, Clayton-Felt released an album independently in 1994, and landed a deal with A&M Records in 1996. His album, Inarticulate Nature Boy, was released in February 1996. It scored airplay on college radio, with the track "Window" reaching No. 49 on Radio & Records' Alternative chart, and led to tours with Tori Amos and Del Amitri. The record did not sell well and Clayton-Felt was dropped; he had been writing a follow-up record, to be titled Center of Six, which he continued to work on in 1998 and 1999 with session drummer Steve Scully.

In December 1999, while still writing for the album, Clayton-Felt was diagnosed with choriocarcinoma, a rare form of a particularly aggressive testicular cancer with the worst prognosis of all germ-cell cancers. He died a month later at the age of 32. Robert B. Weide delivered the eulogy at Clayton-Felt's funeral, in early 2000.

Aftermath
In 2002, Dreamworks Records released a collection of songs from the unfinished Center of Six sessions under the name Spirit Touches Ground. Talking Cloud Records released an album of additional unreleased material under the Center of Six name (including the title track) in 2003.

Discography
Studio albums

Live albums

EPs

Promotional singles

With School of Fish

With The Boon

As composer or session musician

References

External links
[ Josh Clayton-Felt] at Allmusic.com

2000 deaths
American male singer-songwriters
Deaths from cancer in California
Deaths from testicular cancer
1967 births
20th-century American singers
American rock guitarists
Singer-songwriters from Massachusetts
20th-century American male singers
Jewish musicians
American Jews
Jewish rock musicians